Bob Bryan and Mike Bryan were the defending champions, but lost in the final to Daniel Nestor and Nenad Zimonjić, 3–6, 7–6(7–2), [15–13].

Seeds
The top four seeds receive a bye into the second round.

Draw

Finals

Top half

Bottom half

Masters - Doubles